My Cousin Vinny is a 1992 American comedy film directed by Jonathan Lynn, written by Dale Launer, and produced by Launer and Paul Schiff. It stars Joe Pesci, Ralph Macchio, Marisa Tomei, Mitchell Whitfield, Lane Smith, Bruce McGill, and the final film appearance of Fred Gwynne. The film was distributed by 20th Century Fox and released on March 13, 1992.

Macchio and Whitfield play William Gambini and Stanley Rothenstein, two young New Yorkers who are arrested in Alabama and put on trial for a murder they did not commit. Unable to afford a lawyer, they are defended by Gambini's cousin Vinny Gambini (Pesci), newly admitted to the bar, who arrives with his fiancée, Mona Lisa Vito (Tomei). The clash between the brash Italian-American New Yorkers and the more reserved Southern townspeople provide much of the film's humor. The principal location of filming was Monticello, Georgia. 

My Cousin Vinny was a critical and financial success, with Pesci, Gwynne, and Tomei praised for their performances. Tomei won the Academy Award for Best Supporting Actress. Attorneys have also lauded the film for its accurate depiction of criminal procedure and trial strategy.

Plot

Driving through Alabama, Bill Gambini and Stan Rothenstein, college students from New York, shop at a convenience store. After they leave, the store clerk is robbed and killed. Due to circumstantial evidence, Bill is charged with first-degree murder and Stan as an accessory. Bill and Stan hire Bill's cousin, Vinny Gambini, a personal injury lawyer from Brooklyn. Vinny is newly admitted to the bar and has no trial experience. He arrives in Alabama with his fiancée, Mona Lisa Vito, who comes from a family of mechanics.

Vinny fools the trial judge, Chamberlain Haller, that he is experienced enough for the case. However, Haller repeatedly holds him in contempt for his abrasive attitude and ignorance of courtroom decorum. To the alarm of Bill and Stan, Vinny does not cross-examine any of the witnesses in the preliminary hearing. Though he lacks the murder weapon, the district attorney, Jim Trotter III, has a strong case. After Vinny's poor showing at the hearing, Stan fires him and uses the public defender, John Gibbons. However, Gibbons's nerves and severe stutter assists the prosecution's case.

Vinny makes up for his inexperience with an aggressive and perceptive questioning style. When he cross-examines the first witness, he uses his knowledge of the cooking time of grits to force him to admit that his perception of time was inaccurate, meaning he cannot corroborate the prosecution's timeline. Stan fires the public defender and rehires Vinny, who discredits the next two witnesses by questioning their ability to make a positive identification due to obstructions in their sightline and impaired vision.

Trotter produces a surprise witness, the FBI analyst George Wilbur. Vinny objects, as Trotter failed to inform him ahead of time, but Haller overrules the objection. Wilbur testifies that the pattern and chemical analysis of the tire marks left at the crime scene are identical to the tires on Bill's car. In cross-examination, Wilbur admits the tires on Bill's car are the most popular in America. 

Haller orders a lunch recess after Wilbur's testimony. Vinny asks for a full day's continuance to properly prepare for cross-examination, but Haller refuses. With only the lunch recess to prepare and unable to prepare a line of questioning, Vinny lashes out at Lisa, but realizes that one of her photos holds the key to the case: the flat and even tire marks over the curb reveal that Bill's car could not have been used for the getaway.

Vinny drags an angry Lisa into court to testify as an expert witness on cars. Lisa testifies that only a car with an independent rear suspension and Positraction could have made the tire marks, which rules out Bill's 1964 Buick Skylark. One model of car with these features is the similar-looking 1963 Pontiac Tempest. As because both Buick and Pontiac are owned by GM, the Pontiac Tempest was also available in the same finish as Bill's car. Vinny recalls Wilbur, who confirms this information, discrediting his own testimony. Vinny recalls the local sheriff, who testifies that two men who fit Bill and Stan's descriptions have been arrested in Georgia for driving a car similar to Bill's, and were in possession of a gun of the same caliber used in the murder. Trotter dismisses all charges. The judge congratulates Vinny and, as they drive away, Vinny and Lisa bicker about their wedding plans.

Cast

Development
Screenwriter Dale Launer came up with the idea for My Cousin Vinny as a college student, after hearing about a lawyer who had finally passed the bar after their 13th attempt. Launer thought it would be funny to have someone traveling through the Southern United States run into legal trouble and end up being represented by that type of lawyer. Launer did not develop the concept until after he had written a few successful screenplays including Ruthless People and Dirty Rotten Scoundrels. He was inspired by the comedy of Sam Kinison, particularly his approach with hecklers, in developing Vinny, and he based the relationship between Vinny and his fiancée on two dating friends who would argue frequently. Launer also took a road trip through the south in which he got stuck in the mud and had repairs to fix his car, which became part of the script. He met an assistant district attorney who became the basis of the character of Jim Trotter, including casting Lane Smith for the role. He spent several sessions with an attorney to review the process of legal trials, and learned from him that much of criminal court proceedings are not taught in law school but come from practice, which served well for Vinny's character.

For casting, the studio originally wanted Andrew Dice Clay for Vinny, but this did not work out. Other considerations included Danny DeVito, Peter Falk, Robert De Niro, and Jim Belushi, but save for De Niro and DeVito, none of these were the Italian American they were looking for. They eventually cast Joe Pesci, who had just finished Lethal Weapon 2, was finishing filming in Goodfellas, and was an ideal choice for the role. For Mona Lisa, they had approached Lorraine Bracco and Carole Davis, but both had passed on the role. Director Jonathan Lynn auditioned several other actresses, but found Marisa Tomei when he was invited to the set of Oscar by John Landis, where Tomei had a minor part. While Fox wanted an actress with more fame, they agreed to Tomei. Ben Stiller and Will Smith were considered for the roles of Bill and Stan but, in both cases, there was concern related to the incarceration of a Jewish and Black person in the South, and Ralph Macchio and Mitchell Whitfield were hired instead.

Exterior filming was done near the town of Greensboro, Georgia; the exterior shots of the courthouse and the surrounding square were shot in Monticello, Georgia (Jasper County) and the courthouse scenes were shot in a set in Covington, Georgia used for In the Heat of the Night.  The prison scenes were shot in a real, working prison and the prisoners appearing as extras were actual convicts.

Release
My Cousin Vinny was released in the United States on March 13, 1992.

Reception

Box office
With a budget of $11 million, My Cousin Vinny was more successful than anticipated, grossing $52,929,168 domestically and $11,159,384 internationally, bringing its overall worldwide total to $64,088,552.

Critical response
On Rotten Tomatoes, the film holds a rating of 87%, based on 60 reviews. The site's consensus reads, "The deft comic interplay between Joe Pesci and Marisa Tomei helps to elevate My Cousin Vinny predictable script, and the result is a sharp, hilarious courtroom comedy." On Metacritic the film has a score of 68 out of 100 based on reviews from 23 critics. Audiences polled by CinemaScore gave the film a grade of "A-" on an A+ to F scale.

Roger Ebert of The Chicago-Sun Times gave My Cousin Vinny 2.5 stars out of a possible 4. He declared that despite Macchio's co-star billing the actor was given little to do, and the film seemed adrift until "lightning strikes" with the final courtroom scenes when Gwynne, Pesci and Tomei all gave humorous performances. Ebert's television partner, Gene Siskel of the Chicago Tribune, liked the film more, singling out Dale Launer's screenplay for praise.

Awards and nominations

Continuing reputation
Despite the good-but-not-great initial reviews, My Cousin Vinny is generally considered to have held up as one of the most remembered and watched movies of 1992. The movie performed well in home video sales and rentals (originally VHS, and eventually DVD) and received frequent play on cable television. The film's catchier quotes became well-known as well.

One element that aged somewhat awkwardly was Austin Pendleton's role as a stuttering and ineffective public defender. Pendleton suffered from stuttering in his childhood before overcoming it; during filming he did not enjoy dredging up bad memories from his teenage years and, afterward, he was not pleased to be publicly associated with the character. In a 2022 interview, he said that he felt the role nearly ended his career, and, after receiving angry letters from stutterers, said he regretted agreeing to perform the role at all. Casting director David Rubin said that Pendleton's scenes, while funny, probably would have been changed significantly in a newer movie.

Legal accuracy
Director Jonathan Lynn has a law degree from Cambridge University, and lawyers have praised the accuracy of My Cousin Vinnys depiction of courtroom procedure and trial strategy, with one stating that "[t]he movie is close to reality even in its details. Part of why the film has such staying power among lawyers is because, unlike, say, A Few Good Men, everything that happens in the movie could happen—and often does happen—at trial". One legal textbook discusses the film in detail as an "entertaining [and] extremely helpful introduction to the art of presenting expert witnesses at trial for both beginning experts and litigators"; furthermore, criminal defenders, law professors, and other lawyers use the film to demonstrate rules of evidence, voir dire, relevance, and cross examination.

Seventh Circuit Court of Appeals judge Richard Posner praised My Cousin Vinny as being:

In "Ten Things Every Trial Lawyer Could Learn From Vincent La Guardia Gambini", District of South Carolina judge Joseph F. Anderson praised Vinny's courtroom methods as "a textbook example" of Irving Younger's "Ten Commandments of Cross-Examination", and wrote that the film predicted the 1999 Kumho Tire Co. v. Carmichael ruling on the Daubert standard. He concluded that Lynn and scriptwriter Dale Launer "have given our profession a wonderful teaching tool while producing a gem of a movie that gives the public at large renewed faith in the common law trial and the adversarial system as the best way to determine the truth and achieve justice". In a 2019 decision, Merrick Garland, then the Chief Judge of the United States Court of Appeals for the District of Columbia Circuit, wrote "In 1992, Vincent Gambini taught a master class in cross-examination.", and further extensively quoted from a cross-examination scene in the film.

John Marshall Law School professor Alberto Bernabe wrote that "Vinny is terrible at the things we do teach in law school, but very good at the things we don't":

United States Supreme Court Justice Antonin Scalia cited My Cousin Vinny as an example of the principle that a client can choose his own lawyer, but United States Senator John Kennedy told District Court nominee Matthew S. Petersen that having seen the film did not qualify one to be a federal judge during his failed 2017 confirmation hearing. The authors of Reel Justice: The Courtroom Goes to the Movies (2006) gave the film its highest rating along with several films based on real trials, such as Judgment at Nuremberg and Breaker Morant. In 2008 the ABA Journal ranked the film #3 on its list of the "25 Greatest Legal Movies", and in 2010 ranked Pesci's character as #12 on its list of "The 25 Greatest Fictional Lawyers (Who Are Not Atticus Finch)".

Lynn, an opponent of capital punishment, believes that the film expresses an anti-death penalty message without "preaching to people", and demonstrates the unreliability of eyewitness testimony. Lawyers find the film appealing, according to the director, because "there aren't any bad guys", with the judge, prosecutor, and Vinny all seeking justice. Lynn stated that both he and Launer attempted to accurately depict the legal process in Vinny, favorably comparing it to Trial and Error, for which he could not make what he believed were necessary changes.

Sequels

Proposed film
In an interview on March 14, 2012, the film's screenwriter, Dale Launer, talked about a sequel he had written involving Vinny Gambini practicing law in England. Marisa Tomei dropped out. The studio hired another screenwriter to rework the script without Tomei's character. Eventually, the project was shelved.

Novel series
In 2017, author Lawrence Kelter began a My Cousin Vinny novel series with Back to Brooklyn, which is intended to be in the spirit of The Thin Man series. With the setting updated to contemporary times, the series depicts the further cases of Vinny Gambini with Mona Lisa operating as his investigator. After additionally writing a novelization of My Cousin Vinny alongside the first sequel, a third book, titled Wing and a Prayer, was published in August 2020.

Album
Pesci reprised the Vinny Gambini character for his 1998 album Vincent LaGuardia Gambini Sings Just for You, which contains the song "Yo, Cousin Vinny". The album cover portrays Pesci in a red suit similar to the usher suit he wore in the film.

See also
 Trial film
 Banda Yeh Bindaas Hai

References

External links

 
 
 
 Transcript of the trial proceedings
  Goodreads entry for My Cousin Vinny: Back to Brooklyn

1992 films
1992 comedy films
1990s English-language films
1990s legal films
American comedy films
American courtroom films
American legal films
Films about cousins
Films about lawyers
Films directed by Jonathan Lynn
Films featuring a Best Supporting Actress Academy Award-winning performance
Films set in Alabama
Films shot in Georgia (U.S. state)
20th Century Fox films
Films with screenplays by Dale Launer
Films scored by Randy Edelman
Legal comedy films
1990s American films